Bridel is a surname. Notable people with the surname include:

AJ Bridel (born c. 1994), Canadian actress and singer
Bedřich Bridel (1619–1680, also known as Fridrich Bridelius), Czech baroque writer, poet and missionary
Doyen Bridel (1757–1845), Swiss writer
Marc Bridel (1883–1931), French pharmacist and chemist
Samuel Élisée von Bridel (1761–1828, also known as Samuel Elisée Bridel-Brideri), Swiss botanist